Hymenocardiinae is a subtribe of the plant family Phyllanthaceae. It comprises 2 genera.

See also 
 Taxonomy of the Phyllanthaceae

References 

Phyllanthaceae
Plant subtribes